was a Japanese martial arts expert, holder of the 10th Dan.

Personal history
Kenei Mabuni was born in Shuri, Okinawa. As the son of Kenwa Mabuni, the founder of the Shitō-ryū and one of the most important karate experts in the history of the martial arts, he was in touch with karate and some of its greatest masters such as Miyagi Chojun, Funakoshi Gichin, and Motobu Chōki from childhood. Besides his karate practice he also studied several other martial arts such as aikidō, kendō, Okinawan kobudō, jujutsu, jûdô, and ninjutsu. At the age of 34 he became the head of Shitō-ryū.

In particular, Mabuni Kenei emphasized the importance of the spiritual contents and values of karatedō. Without generally refusing sport-oriented karate he supported a clear distinction between traditional karatedō and sport karate.

Among his achievements is the completion of the kata Shimpā that his father had created but not completed. This kata was inspired by the Uechi-ryū. He was the author of several books about the Shitō-ryū techniques and of one book about the historical roots and the spiritual basics of karate as budō art. On December 19, 2015, he died at the age of 97.

Kenei Mabuni was succeeded by his son, Kenyu Mabuni, as the third Soke of Shito-Ryu. Kenyu was anointed the next Soke (successor) of the system in an inauguration ceremony held on February 28, 2016, in Osaka, continuing his father’s and his grandfather’s work which is the spread of the original Shito ryu Karate do worldwide.

Publications

References

 Gabrielle & Roland Habersetzer, Encyclopédie des arts martiaux de l'Extrême-Orient, Ed. Amphora, Paris, 2004.

External links
British Karate-Do Shito-Kai
Canadian & International Shito-Ryu Karate Resource Center

1918 births
Okinawan male karateka
People from Naha
2015 deaths
Shitō-ryū practitioners